Nevermind is a 1991 album by American rock band Nirvana.

Nevermind or Never mind may also refer to:
Nevermind (1989 video game), a 1989 video game by MC Lothlorien
Nevermind (2015 video game), a 2015 video game
Never Mind, a 1992 novel by Edward St Aubyn
Never Mind! : A Twin's Novel, a 2004 children's book by Avi and Rachel Vail
"Never mind" (Saturday Night Live), a frequent exclamation of fictional character Emily Litella

Music
"Never Mind" (Cliff Richard song), a 1959 song written by Ian Samwell
"Never Mind", a 1987 song by the Replacements from Pleased to Meet Me
"Nevermind", a 1985 song by Red Hot Chili Peppers from Freaky Styley
"Nevermind (What Was It Anyway)", a 2000 song by Sonic Youth from NYC Ghosts & Flowers
"Never Mind" (Jann Arden song), 2001
"Nevermind" (The Birthday Massacre song), 2004
Nevermind, a 2006 album by Clockcleaner
"Nevermind", a 2014 song by Foster the People from Supermodel
"Nevermind", a 2020 song by Hrvy
"Nevermind", a 2014 song by Leonard Cohen from Popular Problems
"Nevermind" (Dennis Lloyd song), a 2016 song by Israeli Dennis Lloyd
"Never Mind", a 2020 song by Lil Wayne from Funeral

See also
Never You Mind, a 2000 album by the New Amsterdams